"E-Pro" is the opening track on Beck's 2005 album Guero. It was released as the lead single from the album in March 2005.  The song was Beck's second number 1 on the Modern Rock chart and his first in eleven years. Beck used the rhythm track of the Beastie Boys' "So What'cha Want" as a sample in "E-Pro". Both of those songs are featured in the video game Rock Band 2.

Music video
The music video for the song was created by Shynola. It is set in a computer-animated wireframe environment, where Beck rises from a grave and digs up a dog, only to be pursued by skeletal zombies. He escapes on what appears to be a bike, the wheels of which turn into legs and climb buildings. Near the middle of the video, his head is knocked off and is washed in a washing machine and fished out of a river, only to be shot back onto his neck via cannon. Near the end Beck is seen running from a giant skull made up of the graveyard gate and headstones. He begins jumping up a series of musical notes, finally teetering on the last one as the song abruptly cuts off and the video fades to black. Subsequently, the video was nominated for "Best Music Video" in the 2005 Arias Awards.

Beck suffered a spinal injury during the shooting of the video while harnessed inside a moving wheel. His injuries forced him to limit his touring for a number of years before making a recovery.

Track listing

CD
 "E-Pro" – 3:25
 "Venom Confection" ("E-Pro" remix by Green, Music & Gold) – 3:05
 "Ghost Range" ("E-Pro" remix by Homelife) – 4:26
 "E-Pro" video

7"
 "E-Pro"
 "Bad Cartridge" ("E-Pro" remix by Paza)

Charts

References

External links
 (CD)
"E-Pro" video screenshots at the Shynola website

2005 singles
Beck songs
Rap rock songs
Interscope Records singles
Songs written by Beck
Song recordings produced by Dust Brothers
Songs written by John King (record producer)
Songs written by Michael Simpson (producer)
2005 songs
Songs written by Mike D
Songs written by Adam Yauch
Songs written by Ad-Rock